Acyltransferase is a type of transferase enzyme that acts upon acyl groups.

Examples include:
 Glyceronephosphate O-acyltransferase
 Lecithin-cholesterol acyltransferase
Long-chain-alcohol O-fatty-acyltransferase

See also
 Acetyltransferase

External links
 

Transferases
EC 2.3